Newton railway station was a railway station on the Singapore-Kranji Railway, serving Newton from 1903 to 1932.

History
Originally to be named Scott's Road railway station, Newton railway station was opened to the public on 1 January 1903, along Bukit Timah Road, as one of the first four railway stations in Singapore, along with the Tank Road, Cluny Road and Bukit Timah railway stations. The station was built in next to Bukit Timah Canal, and was near several swamps. The station master in charge of the station was V. S. Chundrapillai. Pillar boxes were installed in both Newton station and Tank Road station later that year. By February 1906, the station was only serviced by rickshaws, as the tram lines did not extend to the area surrounding the station.

In November 1906, authorities began filling up the swampy ground around Newton station with earth from filter beds at the excavation at Bukit Timah Road, to prevent the spread of malaria, which had been made common at the station due to the swampy ground. A new siding was erected at the station to facilitate the deposition of the earth. In 1909, the loop lines and sidings of the station were lengthened to provide for the increased length of trains.

As it was decided that Tank Road station was unfit to be the terminus of the line, it was decided that the Bukit Timah-Tank Road section of the line would be abandoned, and the line would instead deviate in between Bukit Panjang and Bukit Timah, travelling down a different route which ran along the west of the main town, to a new terminal station at Tanjong Pagar. Newton station, along with the rest of the Bukit Timah-Tank Road section of the line, was closed and abandoned on 2 May 1932, with the opening of the new terminus at Tanjong Pagar.

After the station was demolished, the Newton Circus Roundabout was built on the former station grounds.

Incidents
On 2 November 1904, the engine of a train arriving at Newton station from Tank Road station took the main line instead of the platform line. A truck carrying coal, which had been coupled to the engine, went down the platform line, and was dragged by the engine on the opposite side, and derailed, falling to its side. The luggage van was derailed and a third-class compartment was partially derailed. None of the passengers were injured. The derailment resulted in the track between Newton station and Tank Road station being blocked. The accident was caused by the movable guiding rail being out of place.

On 27 May 1905, Abdul Nazaar, the gateman of the level crossing at Chancery Lane, near Newton station, fell asleep, and failed to open the gate for a train. This resulted in the engine colliding with the gate. However, the train did not sustain any damage. Nazaar was charged with neglecting his duty and endangering the safety of passengers of the railway, on 1 June 1905.

On 23 August 1906, a coolie fell asleep on a bench at the station while waiting for a train, and a porter later discovered that the man had died.

On 10 November 1912, a man named Hamid crashed his car into the railway gate at the crossing near Newton station. A car wheel went over the foot of Gunda Singh, the gatekeeper, who was later admitted into a hospital. Hamid was charged with driving in a rash manner, injuring Gunda Singh, and mischief by damaging the gate on 11 November.

Routes

References

Railway stations in Singapore opened in 1903
Defunct railway stations in Singapore
Railway stations closed in 1932